Nabil Ghilas (born 20 April 1990) is a professional footballer who most recently played as a striker for Athlético Marseille. Internationally, he represented the Algeria national team.

Club career

Early years and Moreirense
Born in Marseille, France, Ghilas only played amateur football in the country. In 2010, aged 20, he transferred to Moreirense F.C. in Portugal, being immediately loaned to F.C. Vizela in the third division. He returned for the 2011–12 season, helping the club return to the Primeira Liga after a seven-year absence.

Ghilas played all 30 games for the Moreira de Cónegos side in the 2012–13 campaign, scoring 13 goals in the league and 16 overall. Highlights included braces in home wins against C.D. Nacional (3–1) and S.C. Beira-Mar (3–0), but his team suffered immediate relegation.

Porto
On 8 July 2013, Ghilas joined FC Porto on a four-year contract for a fee rumoured to be around €3 million, with a buyout clause of €30m. He made his official debut on 22 September, playing injury time in a 2–2 draw at G.D. Estoril Praia.

Ghilas scored his first goal for the northerners on 5 February 2014, against the same opponent for a 2–1 home win in the quarter-finals of the Taça de Portugal. His second came 22 days later, as he netted the 3–3 at Eintracht Frankfurt in the UEFA Europa League round of 32 and Porto progressed 5–5 on aggregate; on both occasions, he came on as a second-half substitute.

On 1 September 2014, Ghilas was loaned to Spanish club Córdoba CF. His maiden La Liga appearance occurred on 12 September, replacing Mike Havenaar in the 59th minute of a 1–1 away draw against UD Almería.

Ghilas scored his first goal for the Andalusians on 18 October, netting his team's only in a 2–1 home loss to Málaga CF. On 10 July 2015, he moved to fellow league side Levante UD on loan for one year.

International career
Ghilas was called up to the Algeria national team for the first time in March 2013, for the 2014 FIFA World Cup qualifier against Benin, but did not play in the match. He won his first cap on 9 June against the same opponent and for the same competition, replacing Islam Slimani in the 74th minute and scoring the last goal in a 3–1 away victory.

Ghilas made his World Cup debut on 17 June 2014, playing the last six minutes of a 2–1 group stage loss to Belgium in Belo Horizonte.

Personal life
Ghilas' older brother, Kamel, is also a former footballer and a forward. He too played in France, Portugal and for Algeria.

Career statistics

Club

International goals

Scores and results list Algeria's goal tally first, score column indicates score after each Ghilas goal.

Honours
Porto
Supertaça Cândido de Oliveira: 2013

References

External links

1990 births
Living people
French sportspeople of Algerian descent
Footballers from Marseille
Algerian footballers
French footballers
Association football forwards
Algeria international footballers
2014 FIFA World Cup players
Primeira Liga players
Liga Portugal 2 players
Segunda Divisão players
La Liga players
Süper Lig players
SO Cassis Carnoux players
Moreirense F.C. players
F.C. Vizela players
FC Porto players
FC Porto B players
Vitória F.C. players
Córdoba CF players
Levante UD footballers
Gaziantepspor footballers
Göztepe S.K. footballers
Athlético Marseille players
Algerian expatriate footballers
French expatriate footballers
Algerian expatriate sportspeople in Portugal
Expatriate footballers in Portugal
Algerian expatriate sportspeople in Spain
French expatriate sportspeople in Spain
Expatriate footballers in Spain
Algerian expatriate sportspeople in Turkey
Expatriate footballers in Turkey